The bantamweight class in the boxing at the 1964 Summer Olympics competition was the second-lightest class.  Bantamweights were limited to those boxers weighing less than 54 kilograms. The competition was held from October 11, 1964, to October 23, 1964. 32 boxers from 32 nations competed.

Medallists

Results

Sources

References

Bantamweight